Sir Charles Ireland Gray  (25 January 1929 – 10 February 2023) was a Scottish Labour Party politician.

Life and career
Charles Gray was born on 25 January 1929. He joined the Labour Party at age 16. Gray rose to become leader of Strathclyde Regional Council from 1986 to 1992 and President of the Convention of Scottish Local Authorities.

In November 2013, Gray announced that he planned to vote 'Yes' in the 2014 Scottish independence referendum, and urged all Labour supporters to do the same.

Gray died on 10 February 2023, at the age of 94.

References

1929 births
2023 deaths
Commanders of the Order of the British Empire
Knights Bachelor
Leaders of local authorities of Scotland
Politicians awarded knighthoods
Scottish Labour councillors
Scottish nationalists